AR Motorsport is an auto racing team based in the Netherlands.

References

External links

Dutch auto racing teams
Formula Renault Eurocup teams
International Formula Masters teams

Auto racing teams established in 1992